Nethmi Nisheka Roshel Rogers (born 6 November 1998) popularly known as Nethmi Roshel, is a Sri Lankan actress and model. Her first television appearance was on the teledrama Sakkaran followed by her role as Aksha on Deweni Inima, which thrusted her into public attention. Her first film appearance was as Parami in Adaraneeya Prarthana, which released both internationally and domestically in 2022, opening to positive reviews from critics.

Early life 
Nethmi Nisheka Roshel Rogers was born on 6 November 1998 in Colombo, Sri Lanka. The eldest with two younger siblings, she attended Bomiriya Central College, and following her graduation, the University of Sri Jayewardenepura. In 2019, she won first place in Jathika Rupavahini Awurudu Kumariya, and was entitled "Miss Photogenic 2019".

Currently, while pursuing her higher education, she works as an actress, model, and a brand ambassador.

Career  
In addition to her television and film ventures, Rogers has worked as a model for several promotional photoshoots, and is a brand ambassador for brands such as Tecno Camon, and Nescafé.

Television 
Her debut in television was as 'Jayawathi' on the teledrama Sakkaran, which aired on Sirasa TV. Her gradual rise to popularity led her to the role of Aksha on the television soap opera Deweni Inima. Similarly, she has enacted roles in the teledramas Hiru Awidin, and Rawana (season 2).

Film 
Her mainstream film debut is as "Parami" on the Sri Lankan romance movie, Adaraneeya Prarthana, which was released in 2022 in Sri Lanka, USA, Australia, Canada, UAE, and Japan. The film received critical acclaim for its refreshing take on young modern romance, with critics praising the performances, soundtrack, and cinematography of the movie. Furthermore, in December 2021, she ventured into the genre of short film, by starring in Cherry Blossom directed by Jo Dissanayake.Similarly, in April 2022, she starred as the vivacious, and arrogant Kata-malee in the Avurudu telefilm Wasanthe, which aired on TV Derana.

Personal life  
Rogers is an avid pet lover, and often advocates the better treatment of animals on social media. She was a contributor to the "Feed A Child" programme that was organised by TV Derana on its 17th anniversary, and has spoken about the pressures that Sri Lankan children face in light of the current economic crisis.

Filmography

Television

Film

Music videos

References

External links 

 
Nethmi Roshel at YouTube

1998 births
Living people
21st-century Sri Lankan actresses
Sri Lankan film actresses
Sri Lankan television actresses
Sinhalese actresses